Banksia columnaris is a species of column-like shrub that is endemic to Western Australia. It has pinnatifid leaves with between five and eighteen lobes on each side, heads of pale yellow to purple flowers and usually only one or two follicles forming in each head.

Description
Banksia columnaris is a shrub that typically grows to a height of  but does not form a lignotuber.

Taxonomy and naming
This banksia was first formally described in 1996 by Alex George in the journal Nuytsia and given the name Dryandra columnaris from specimens he collected in 1969 in the Boyagin Nature Reserve near Brookton. In 2007, Austin Mast and Kevin Thiele transferred all the dryandras to the genus Banksia and this species became Banksia columnaris. The specific epithet (columnaris) is a Latin word meaning "column-like", referring to the habit of this species.

Distribution and habitat
Banksia columnaris grows in low woodland and kwongan in a few areas between Brookton and Narrogin in the Avon Wheatbelt and Jarrah Forest biogeographic regions.

References

columnaris
Endemic flora of Western Australia
Eudicots of Western Australia
Plants described in 1996
Taxa named by Kevin Thiele